Farès Mecheri (born 6 December 1983) is a French-Algerian football who played as a striker.

Club career
Mecheri was born in Lyon, France.

On 14 January 2009, he joined Wydad Casablanca from USM Alger. after, he played just three matches and scored one goal against Kawkab Marrakech. On 30 June 2009, Wydad Casablanca announced that they had terminated amicably his contract.

Honours
 Won the Arab Champions League once with ES Setif in 2008

References

1983 births
Living people
Association football forwards
Algerian footballers
French footballers
French sportspeople of Algerian descent
USM Alger players
Footballers from Lyon
Wydad AC players
ES Sétif players
Expatriate footballers in Morocco
Algerian expatriates in Morocco